Al-'Arsh District is a district of the Al Bayda Governorate, Yemen. As of 2003, the district had a population of 45,773 inhabitants.

References

Districts of Al Bayda Governorate
Al A'rsh District